Arthur P. Murphy (May 18, 1898 - November 7, 1977) served in the Idaho State House of Representatives from 1937 to 1956 and the Idaho State Senate from 1957 until his death.

He also played professional baseball.

He was born in Sandpoint, Idaho and died in Spokane, Washington.

References

1898 births
1977 deaths
Idaho state senators
Members of the Idaho House of Representatives
People from Sandpoint, Idaho
Baseball players from Idaho
Minor league baseball players
20th-century American politicians